Cuba competed at the 1924 Summer Olympics in Paris, France.  It was the first time in 20 years that Cuban athletes had competed at the Olympic Games.

Fencing

Six fencers, all men, represented Cuba in 1924. It was the nation's third appearance in the sport as well as the Games. The all-épée Cuban team included Ramón Fonst, who had won three individual gold medals and a team gold medal in 1900 and 1904. Fonst was eliminated in the semifinal round, while the Cuban épée team fell in the quarterfinals.

 Men

Ranks given are within the pool.

Sailing

Three sailors represented Cuba in 1924. It was the nation's debut in the sport.

References

 Official Olympic Reports

Nations at the 1924 Summer Olympics
1924
Olympics